The North Madagascar Current is an ocean current near Madagascar. The Madagascar current is split into two currents: the North Madagascar Current and the East Madagascar Current (EMC). The North Madagascar Current (NMC) flows into the South Equatorial Current just north of Madagascar and is directed into the Mozambique Channel, this connects to the gyre's equatorial currents into the Agulhas Current off the coast of Southeastern Africa.

See also 
 Ocean current
 Oceanic gyres
 Physical oceanography

References

Currents of the Indian Ocean
Geography of Madagascar